The Tomb of Bian Que is a monument to the mythical Chinese physician Bian Que located in the city of Jinan, Shandong, China on the foot of Que Hill. The tomb consists of a burial mound that stands about one metre tall and has a flat top consisting of loose soil framed by a ring of stone slabs. In front of the burial mount stands a stela inscribed in 1753.

Other tombs dedicated to Bian Que can be found in Hebei, Henan, and Shanxi.

See also
List of sites in Jinan

Tourist attractions in Jinan
Tombs in China